Ulises Virreyra (born 16 April 1998) is an Argentine professional footballer who plays as a midfielder for Gimnasia y Esgrima.

Career
Virreyra's senior career with Gimnasia y Esgrima started in the 2016–17 campaign, with him making his professional bow during a home loss to Chacarita Juniors on 18 December 2016. His first goal arrived in the following March when he netted the second goal of a 2–0 victory over Crucero del Norte. Another goal followed five months later in the reverse fixture with Crucero del Norte, with those goals arriving either side of a strike against Villa Dálmine.

Career statistics
.

References

External links

1997 births
Living people
Sportspeople from Jujuy Province
Argentine footballers
Association football midfielders
Primera Nacional players
Gimnasia y Esgrima de Jujuy footballers
Club Olimpo footballers